Geremia and Geremias are surnames. 

Those bearing them include:

14-17th century 
 Geremia Ghisi, a Venetian nobleman who in ca. 1207 followed the Fourth Crusade
 Geremia da Montagnone (died 1320/1321), Italian judge and author active in Padua 
 Pietro Geremia (1399-1452), Italian Roman Catholic priest and a professed member from the Order of Preachers
 Cristoforo di Geremia (1410–1476), Italian artist
 Geremia da Valacchia, O.F.M. Cap. (1556-1625), Blessed, Romanian-born Capuchin lay brother who served as an infirmarian of the Order in Italy

19-20th century 
 Andreas Geremia (fl. 1980s), German musician in band Tankard band
 Conceição Geremias (born 1956), Brazilian athlete
 Jérémie Roumegous Geremia (born 1985), French footballer
 Nery Geremias Orellana (1985–2011), Honduran journalist
 Paul Geremia (born 1944), American musician
 Steph Geremia, Irish-American female flute player and singer 
 Geremia Bonomelli (1831–1914), Italian Roman Catholic bishop of Cremona

See also
 Jeremiah (surname)

it:Geremia (disambigua)